KPMC-LD (channel 43) is a low-power television station in Bakersfield, California, United States, affiliated with HSN. It is owned by Cocola Broadcasting.

History
The station's current owner, Cocola Broadcasting, founded the station on April 14, 2004, and signed on the station on May 5, 2008.

On August 24, 2009, KPMC-LP put in an application for a construction permit to flash cut to digital operations on channel 43; the flash cut was completed on September 21 of that year. However, as a result of technical difficulties, the station would continue to remain silent until October 14, 2015. The station would return to the air with programming from Home Shopping Network on that day, simultaneously changing its call sign to KPMC-LD.

Subchannel

References

External links
Cocola TV Website

PMC-LD
Television channels and stations established in 2004